Diliolophus vexator is a species of beetle in the family Cerambycidae, and the only species in the genus Diliolophus. It was described by Henry Walter Bates in 1885.

References

Desmiphorini
Beetles described in 1885
Monotypic Cerambycidae genera